MB-3 may refer to:

 MB-3 (drug), an enzyme inhibitor
 Thomas-Morse MB-3, a biplane from the 1920s
 Martin-Baker MB 3, an experimental WWII aircraft